Dr. Narayana Subramaniam is an Indian singer, author and head and neck surgical oncologist.  He is the son of violinist and composer Dr. L. Subramaniam and Viji Subramaniam.  His father married Playback singer Kavita Krishnamurti in 1999.

He has been a featured artist on Vande Mataram, Vaishnava Janato, and Bhajans for Kids.

He has co-authored ‘Lakshminarayana Global Music Festival: Twenty Years of Global Collaborations’ and ‘Festival Beyond Borders’.

Education 
Narayana completed his MBBS and his MS General Surgery from M. S. Ramaiah Medical College. Following this, he completed his diploma from the Royal College of Surgeons Edinburgh. In 2015, he completed his MCh in head and neck surgical oncology from Amrita Institute of Medical Sciences Kochi as one of the first surgeons in Karnataka to receive this degree and also received a fellowship in robotic surgery. He has also received additional training from two centres of excellence, the University of Pennsylvania and Sydney Head and Neck Cancer Institute.

References 

Year of birth missing (living people)
Living people